The Williams River is a perennial stream that is a tributary of the Hunter River, in the Hunter Region of New South Wales, Australia.

Course and features
The Williams River rises on the southern slopes of the Barrington Tops below Careys Peak within Barrington Tops National Park, and flows generally southeast and south, joined by ten tributaries including Chichester River, before reaching its confluence with the Hunter River at Raymond Terrace. The river descends  over its  course; through Dungog, Clarence Town and Seaham.

At Clarence Town, the Williams River is crossed by the Clarence Town bridge that carries Limeburners Creek Road; and in Dungog, the river is crossed by the Cooreei Bridge that carries Stroud Hill Road. Both bridges are listed on the New South Wales State Heritage Register.

See also

 Grahamstown Dam
 List of rivers of Australia

Gallery

References

External links
 

Dungog Shire
Port Stephens Council
Rivers of the Hunter Region
Mid North Coast
Hunter River (New South Wales)